The Masmak Fort, also called the Masmak Fortress or Masmak Palace, is a clay and mudbrick fort in ad-Dirah, Riyadh, Saudi Arabia, located in close proximity to the Justice Palace. Built in 1865 for prince 'Abdurrahman ibn Sulaiman AlDabaan under the Emirate of Jabal Shammar, The fortress played an integral role in the Unification of Saudi Arabia, with the Battle of Riyadh, one of the most important conflicts of the Saudi unification, taking place in the fort. Since 1995, the fortress has been converted into a museum showcasing one of the most important landmarks of Saudi heritage.

History
The construction of the fort was started by Abdullah bin Faisal, Emir of Najd, in 1865. It was completed in 1895 by Emir of Riyadh, 'Abdurrahman ibn Sulaiman under the reign of Muhammad bin Abdullah Al Rashid, the ruler of the Emirate of Jabal Shammar and head of the House of Rasheed, who had wrested control of the city from the local House of Saud, who later went into exile. It was built with four watchtowers and thick walls, with a foundation of stone blocks, lying in the center of Riyadh, in the old city, part of the modern Deira district. It is one of the only historic buildings that has survived in the kingdom. The building was situated in the commercial center of historic Riyadh. 

In January 1902, Emir 'Abdulaziz ibn Saud Al Saud, who was at the time living in exile in Kuwait, returned to Riyadh and led an ambush against the Masmak fortress, regaining it from the House of Rasheed in the Battle of Riyadh. The event, which restored Saudi control over Riyadh, is considered one of the most important in the completion of the Unification of Saudi Arabia. It was used as a munitions warehouse from 1902 to 1938 by King Abdulaziz before he moved his court to then newly built Murabba Palace.

In 1979, the Municipality of Riyadh prepared a study for the restoration of the Masmak, following which a renovation of the fortress began. Their vision was realized in 1995 when the Ministry of Education and the Supreme Commission for the Development of Riyadh converted the building into a museum, making it an integral part of Saudi heritage. It was later incorporated into the King Abdulaziz Historical Centre, a series of restored buildings in Riyadh. Centennial celebrations were held in 1999. The museum includes displays several antique guns, costumes and agricultural artifacts.

Architecture 
The Masmak can be divided into six distinct parts: the gate, the mosque, the majlis, the well, the towers and the courtyard.

Gate

There is an opening on the center of the door, called al-Khokha, which is just big enough for one person to pass at a time, and is a defensive feature designed to allow people in and out without opening the door.

Mosque

The mosque is located to the left of the entrance. It is a large room supported by several columns with shelves in the walls for placing mus'hafs of the Quran. A mihrab can be found in the mosque, and there are holes in the walls to provide ventilation.

Majlis

It is located directly ahead of the entrance and is a room in the shape of a rectangle. On the wall facing the entrance and the southern wall, there are holes in the walls for ventilation and lighting, similar to those found in the mosque. 

Well

The well is located in the northeastern corner of the fortress.

Watchtowers

The towers are accessed through staircases located inside them.

Courtyard

The courtyard is surrounded by rooms with columns connected to each other internally, and it has stairs on the eastern side leading to the first floor and roofs, and there are three residential units, the first served as the residence of the ruler, the second used as a bayt al-mal, and the third was allocated for the accommodation of guests.

See also
 Majlis

References

External links 
 Plan and Photographs 
 Virtual tour of the fort

Buildings and structures completed in the 19th century
1995 establishments in Saudi Arabia
Forts in Saudi Arabia
History of Nejd
Ottoman Arabia
Buildings and structures in Riyadh
History museums in Saudi Arabia
Museums established in 1995
Tourist attractions in Riyadh
Castles in Saudi Arabia